Yako Chan is a Taiwanese singer and actress. She was a member of the band Hey Girl.

Early life
Chan's parents divorced when she was young. Alongside her mother and brother, Chan reportedly lived in impoverished conditions, frequently moving between squalid houses, until she entered the entertainment business. In 2016, Chan bought her first apartment, stating that she hoped her mother and brother would now not have to move again.

Career
Chan made her debut on the variety show Blackie's Teenager Club  in 2005.

Filmography

Presenter
Channel V
Blackie Lollipop (Wo ai heise bangbang tang 我愛黑澀棒棒堂)
Blackie's Teenager Club (Wo ai heise hui 我愛黑澀會)
Pop Beauty Wind (Mei mei pupu feng 美眉普普風)
Music Charts (Yinyue biaobang 音樂飆榜)
Popular (Liuxing 流行)
Model Lollipop (Mofan bangbang tang 模范棒棒堂)

Xing Kong
Xing Kong 8-Claw Entertainment: Kuroshio Tribe (Xingkong 8 zhua yu – heihu buluo 星空8爪娛－黑潮部落)

Television

Discography

References

1988 births
Living people
Actresses from Taipei
Musicians from Taipei
21st-century Taiwanese singers
21st-century Taiwanese women singers